Thomas Frederick Davis (February 8, 1804 – December 2, 1871) was the fifth Episcopal Bishop of South Carolina.

Early life
Davis was born in Wilmington, North Carolina, the son of Thomas F. Davis and Sarah I. (Eagles) Davis. His great grandmother was the sister of John and Samuel Ashe.  His brother, George Davis was Attorney General of the Confederate States.  Davis graduated from the University of North Carolina at Chapel Hill in 1822.  He was ordained deacon on November 27, 1831 by Bishop Levi Silliman Ives, and ordained priest the following year on December 16.  As deacon, Davis officiated at St. Bartholomew's Church in Pittsboro, North Carolina and at Calvary Church in Wadesboro, North Carolina.  After his ordination to the priesthood, he became rector of St. James Church in Wilmington and later was rector of St. Luke's Church in Salisbury.  In 1846, he moved to South Carolina to become rector of Grace Church in Camden.

Bishop of South Carolina
Davis was elected Bishop of South Carolina in 1853.  He was the 57th bishop in the PECUSA, and was consecrated by Bishops Thomas Church Brownell, John Henry Hopkins, and Benjamin Bosworth Smith. After secession, he aligned with the Protestant Episcopal Church in the Confederate States of America during the American Civil War. He served as bishop until his death in 1871.

Notes

References

1804 births
1871 deaths
Episcopal bishops of South Carolina
19th-century American Episcopalians
19th-century American clergy